Lubomirskia baikalensis is a freshwater species of sponge that is endemic to Lake Baikal, Russia. It is commonly called the Lake Baikal sponge and it is the most abundant sponge in the lake, but all the approximately 15 species of sponges in the family Lubomirskiidae are restricted to Baikal. 

In relatively shallow water, it is bark-like, and covers stones somewhat like a carpet. On rocky grounds at depths of  the branching form is particularly common and may form "forests". This sponge is in mutual symbiosis with a green dinoflagellate, making it green in appearance.

References

External links
Picture of this species

Haplosclerida
Animals described in 1773
Fauna of Lake Baikal
Taxa named by Peter Simon Pallas